The Italian Music Awards were an accolade established in 2001 by the Federation of the Italian Music Industry to recognize the achievements in the Italian music business both by domestic and international artists.

The awards were given by an academy composed of 400 people, including music publishers, journalists, deejays, music producers, managers, retailers and consumers.

The first Italian Music Awards ceremony was held on 5 February 2001, to honor musical accomplishments for the period between 1 December 1999 and 30 November 2000, while the fourth and last awards ceremony was held on 15 December 2003.
The fifth edition of the awards was initially scheduled to be held in the end of 2004, but after being postponed in February 2004 and then in the Spring of 2004, it was canceled due to the lack of a broadcast agreement with the Italian TV networks.

The gap left by the Italian Music Awards was later filled by the Wind Music Awards, established in 2007.

Winners and nominations

First edition
In the first edition of the Italian Music Awards, the biggest winner was the pop group Lùnapop, who received 4 awards, followed by Carmen Consoli with two awards.

Best Italian Male Artist
 Adriano Celentano
 Biagio Antonacci
 Franco Battiato
 Alex Britti
 Luciano Ligabue
 Eros Ramazzotti

Best Italian Female Artist
 Carmen Consoli
 Elisa
 Irene Grandi
 Mina
 Laura Pausini

Italian Italian Revelation of the Year
 Lùnapop
 Carlotta
 Eiffel 65
 Subsonica
 Tricarico

Best Italian Dance Artist
 Eiffel 65
 Alexia
 Gigi D'Agostino
 Prezioso
 Spiller

Best Italian Group
 Lùnapop
 Avion Travel
 Bluvertigo
 Paola e Chiara
 Subsonica

Best Italian Tour
 Luciano Ligabue
 Claudio Baglioni
 Carmen Consoli
 Jovanotti
 Lùnapop

Best Italian Single
 "Qualcosa di grande" — Lùnapop
 "Parole di burro" — Carmen Consoli
 "Un giorno migliore" — Lùnapop
 "Vamos a bailar (Esta vida nueva)" — Paola e Chiara
 "Io sono Francesco" di Tricarico

Best Italian Videoclip
 "Parole di burro" — Carmen Consoli
 "Una su 1.000.000" — Alex Britti
 "File Not Found" — Jovanotti
 "Qualcosa di grande" — Lùnapop
 "Fuoco nel fuoco" — Eros Ramazzotti

Best Italian Album
 ...Squérez? — Lùnapop
 Canzoni a manovella — Vinicio Capossela
 Esco di rado e parlo ancora meno — Adriano Celentano
 Stato di necessità — Carmen Consoli
 Stilelibero — Eros Ramazzotti
 Microchip emozionale — Subsonica

Best International Female Artist
 Anastacia
 Macy Gray
 Jennifer Lopez
 Madonna
 Sade

Best International Group
 U2
 The Beatles
 Blink 182
 Coldplay
 Morcheeba
 Red Hot Chili Peppers

Best International Male Artist
 Carlos Santana
 Craig David
 Eminem
 Lenny Kravitz
 Moby

Second edition
During the second edition of the Italian Music Awards, the number of categories was strongly increased. The biggest winners were Vasco Rossi and Elisa, receiving three awards each.

Best Italian Album
 Stupido hotel — Vasco Rossi Canzoni a manovella — Vinicio Capossela
 Esco di rado e parlo ancora meno — Adriano Celentano
 Iperbole — Raf
 La descrizione di un attimo — Tiromancino

Best Italian Single
 "Luce (Tramonti a nord est)" — Elisa "Infinito" — Raf
 "Tre parole" — Valeria Rossi
 "Due destini" — Tiromancino
 "Io sono Francesco" — Tricarico

Best Italian Female Artist
 Elisa Giorgia
 Irene Grandi
 Fiorella Mannoia
 Mina
 Valeria Rossi

Best Italian Male Artist
 Vasco Rossi Adriano Celentano
 Raf
 Eros Ramazzotti
 Zucchero

Best Italian Group
 Tiromancino Delta V
 Otto Ohm
 883
 Velvet

Best Italian Revelation of the Year
 Valeria Rossi Tiziano Ferro
 Neffa
 Tiromancino
 Velvet

Best Italian Videoclip
 "L'ultimo bacio" — Carmen Consoli "Luce (Tramonti a nord est)" — Elisa
 "Infinito" — Raf
 "Siamo soli" — Vasco Rossi
 "Baila" — Zucchero

Best Italian Tour
 Vasco Rossi Vinicio Capossela
 Carmen Consoli
 Pino Daniele
 Eros Ramazzotti

Best Italian Dance Artist
 Gigi D'Agostino Alexia
 Eiffel 65
 Planet Funk
 Spiller
 
Best Italian Arrangement
 "La mia signorina" — Neffa
Best Italian Lyrics
 "Il cuoco di Salò" — Francesco De Gregori
Best Italian Composition
 "Luce (Tramonti a nord est)" — Elisa
Best Italian Producer
 Manuel Agnelli (ex-aequo)
 Enzo Miceli (ex-aequo)
Best Italian Graphical Project
 Imaginaria — Almamegretta (ex-aequo)
 Iperbole — Raf (ex-aequo)
Best Italian Dance Producer
 Gigi D'Agostino
Best Italian Soundtrack
 Le fate ignoranti

Best International Album
 All That You Can't Leave Behind — U2 Born to Do It — Craig David
 No Angel — Dido
 Music — Madonna
 Reveal — R.E.M.

Best International Single
 "Trouble" — Coldplay "Crying at the Discoteque" — Alcazar
 "Clint Eastwood" — Gorillaz
 "Don't Tell Me" — Madonna
 "Me Gustas Tú" — Manu Chao

Best International Female Artist
 Anastacia Björk
 Dido
 Macy Gray
 Madonna

Best International Male Artist
 Lenny Kravitz Craig David
 Manu Chao
 Moby
 Robbie Williams

Best International Group
 U2 Coldplay
 Gorillaz
 Jamiroquai
 R.E.M.

Third edition
The third Italian Music Awards ceremony was held on 2 December 2002, host by Piero Chiambretti. The biggest winner of the year was Daniele Silvestri, who received four awards.

Best Italian Album
 Fuori come va? — Luciano Ligabue Then Comes the Sun — Elisa
 Rosso relativo — Tiziano Ferro
 Amorematico — Subsonica
 Shake — Zucchero

Best Italian Single
 "Salirò" — Daniele Silvestri "Rosso relativo" — Tiziano Ferro
 "Vivi davvero" — Giorgia
 "Eri bellissima" — Luciano Ligabue
 "La rondine" — Mango

Best Italian Female Artist
 Carmen Consoli Alexia
 Elisa
 Giorgia
 Laura Pausini

Best Italian Male Artist
 Luciano Ligabue Tiziano Ferro
 Mango
 Francesco Renga
 Daniele Silvestri
 Zucchero

Best Italian Group
 Planet Funk Articolo 31
 Gabin
 Nomadi
 Subsonica

Best Italian Revelation of the Year
 Planet Funk Gabin
 Valentina Giovagnini
 Moony
 Yu Yu

Best Italian Videoclip
 "Salirò" — Daniele Silvestri "Vivi davvero" — Giorgia
 "Stupido hotel" — Vasco Rossi
 "Nuvole rapide" — Subsonica
 "Ahum" — Zucchero

Best Italian Tour
 Luciano Ligabue Francesco De Gregori
 Ron
 Pino Daniele
 Fiorella Mannoia
 Elisa
 Subsonica
 Zucchero

Best Italian Dance Artist
 Planet Funk Eiffel 65
 Gabin
 Moony
 Yu Yu

Best Italian Lyrics
 "Quello che non c'è" — Afterhours (ex-aequo)
 "Stupido hotel" — Vasco Rossi (ex-aequo)
Best Italian Arrangement
 "Salirò" — Daniele Silvestri (ex-aequo)
 "Nuvole rapide" — Subsonica (ex-aequo)
Best Italian Composition
 "Salirò" — Daniele Silvestri
Best Italian Producer
 Enzo Miceli
Best Italian Graphical Project
 Amorematico — Subsonica
Best Italian Soundtrack
 Luce dei miei occhi — Ludovico Einaudi
Best Italian Dance Producer
Molella
Best Synchronization with a TV Spot
 Any Other Name — Thomas Newman and the BMW 3 Series spot

Best International Female Artist
 Anastacia Norah Jones
 Alicia Keys
 Kylie Minogue
 Shakira

Best International Male Artist
 Bruce Springsteen Eminem
 Lenny Kravitz
 Moby
 Robbie Williams

Best International Group
 Red Hot Chili Peppers Coldplay
 Jamiroquai
 Morcheeba
 Noir Désir

Best International Revelation of the Year
 Norah Jones Alicia Keys
 Las Ketchup
 Noir Désir
 Shakira

Classical Award
 Schoenberg: Gurrelieder. Dir. Simon Rattler
Jazz Award
 Footprints Live! — Wayne Shorter
FIMI Special Award — Italian Artist in the World
 Zucchero
FIMI Special Award — Lifetime Achievement Award
 Elton John
Alice Award — Web Artist of the Year
 Lenny Kravitz (ex-aequo)
 Francesco Renga (ex-aequo)
Alice Award — Extraordinary Emotion
 Francesco Renga
RTL Award
 Mark Knopfler

Fourth edition
The fourth and last edition of the Italian Music Awards was held in December 2003. The biggest winners were Le Vibrazioni, Vasco Rossi and Eros Ramazzotti, receiving two awards each.

Best Italian Female Artist
 Carmen Consoli Elisa
 Giorgia
 Irene Grandi
 Laura Pausini

Best Italian Male ArtistEros Ramazzotti Sergio Cammariere
 Cesare Cremonini
 Morgan
 Vasco Rossi

Best Italian Group
 Le Vibrazioni Gemelli Diversi
 Negrita
 Planet Funk
 Subsonica
 Tiromancino

Best Italian Dance Artist
 Planet Funk Eiffel 65
 Moony
 Molella
 Prezioso

Best Italian Album
 9'' — Eros Ramazzotti
 L'eccezione — Carmen Consoli
 Le Vibrazioni — Le Vibrazioni
 Tracks — Vasco Rossi
 In continuo movimento'' — Tiromancino

Best Italian Single
 "Gocce di memoria" — Giorgia
 "Mary" — Gemelli Diversi
 "Prima di partire per un lungo viaggio" — Irene Grandi
 "Dedicato a te" — Le Vibrazioni
 "Per me è importante" — Tiromancino

Best Italian Revelation of the Year
 Le Vibrazioni
 Roberto Angelini
 Sergio Cammariere
 Dj Francesco
 Morgan

Best Italian Videoclip
 "Shpalman®" — Elio e le Storie Tese
 "Gocce di memoria" — Giorgia
 "Dedicato a te" — Le Vibrazioni
 "Un'emozione per sempre" — Eros Ramazzotti
 "Per me è importante" — Tiromancino

Best Italian Tour
 Vasco Rossi
 Claudio Baglioni
 Alex Britti
 Carmen Consoli
 Giorgia

Best International Female Artist
 Dido
 Beyoncé
 Jennifer Lopez
 Madonna
 Skin

Best International Male Artist
 Robbie Williams
 50 Cent
 Ben Harper
 Eminem
 Bruce Springsteen

Best International Group
 Coldplay
 Evanescence
 Simply Red
 Tribalistas
 U2

Best International Revelation of the Year
 Tribalistas
 50 Cent
 Evanescence
 Sean Paul
 Will Young

FIMI Special Award — Contribution to the Music Industry
 Nomadi

FIMI Special Award — Ambassador of the Italian Music in the World
 Luciano Pavarotti

FIMI Special Award
 Vasco Rossi

RTL 102.5 Special Award
 Alex Britti

Cornetto Free Music Festival Live Special Award
 Simple Mind

See also
List of Italian music awards

Notes

Italian music awards